Ramakrishna Hegde ministry was the Council of Ministers in Karnataka, a state in South India headed by Ramakrishna Hegde of the Janata Party.

The ministry had multiple  ministers including the Chief Minister. All ministers belonged to the JP.

After Ramakrishna Hegde quit on 13 February 1986, he was again elected as Janata Legislative Party leader and took charge as Chief Minister of the State on 16 February 1986 and his was in power till he resigned on 10 August 1988. Later S. R. Bommai sworn in as Chief Minister on 13 August 1988. However S. R. Bommai government was dismissed by the then Governor, P. Venkatasubbaiah on 21 April 1989. The dismissal was on the grounds that his government had lost its majority following large-scale defections engineered by several Janata Party leaders of the day. Bommai had sought some time from the Governor to prove his majority on the floor of the Legislature and he was denied this. He challenged this order in the Supreme Court.

S. R. Bommai v. Union of India was a landmark judgment of the Supreme Court of India, where the Court discussed at length, the provisions of Article 356 of the Constitution of India and related issues. The apex court spelt out restrictions on the centre's power to dismiss a state government under Article 356.  This case had huge impact on Centre-State Relations. Instances of imposition of President's rule have reduced after this judgement.

Chief Minister and Cabinet Ministers

Minister of State

See also 

 Karnataka Legislative Assembly

References 

Cabinets established in 1986
1986 establishments in Karnataka
1988 disestablishments in India
Hegde
Hegde
Cabinets disestablished in 1988
1986 in Indian politics